This is the first edition of the tournament.
Franco Ferreiro and Rubén Ramírez Hidalgo won the title, defeating Gastão Elias and Frederico Gil 6–7(4–7), 6–3, [11–9] in the final.

Seeds

Draw

Draw

References
 Main Draw

Sao Leo Open - Doubles
2011 Doubles